Košarac is a surname. Notable people with the surname include:

 Staša Košarac (born 1975), Bosnian Serb politician
 Tanja Karišik-Košarac (born 1991), Bosnian cross-country skier and biathlete

Bosnian surnames
Slavic-language surnames